A list of films produced in the Soviet Union in 1938 (see 1938 in film).

1938

See also
1938 in the Soviet Union

External links
 Soviet films of 1938 at the Internet Movie Database

1938
Soviet
Films